Together is the second album by Norwegian pop duo Marcus & Martinus. It is their first full-length studio album in English. The album was released by Sony Music Entertainment on 4 November 2016 and debuted at number 1 on both the Norwegian VG-lista official albums chart and the Swedish Sverigetopplistan albums chart.

Singles
"Girls" was released as the lead single from the album on 20 May 2016. The song has peaked at number 1 on the Norwegian Singles Chart and number 40 on the Swedish Singles Chart. "Heartbeat" was released as the second single from the album on 24 May 2016. The song has peaked at number 21 on the Norwegian Singles Chart and number 61 on the Swedish Singles Chart. "I Don't Wanna Fall In Love" was released as the third single from the album on 27 May 2016. The song has peaked at number 37 on the Norwegian Singles Chart. "Light It Up" was released as the fourth single from the album on 29 July 2016. The song has peaked at number 9 on the Norwegian Singles Chart and number 23 on the Swedish Singles Chart. "One More Second" was released as the fifth single from the album on 20 October 2016. The song has peaked at number 30 on the Norwegian Singles Chart and number 57 on the Swedish Singles Chart. "Go Where You Go" was released as the sixth single from the album on 28 October 2016. "Without You" was released as the seventh single from the album on 2 November 2016. "Bae" was released as the eighth single from the album on 4 March 2017. The song did not enter the Swedish Singles Chart, but peaked to number 1 on the Sweden Heatseeker Songs.

Track listing

Charts

Weekly charts

Year-end charts

Release history

References

2016 albums